Nicholaus Ryan Kipke (born January 26, 1979) is a Republican member of the Maryland House of Delegates as of 2007 and from 2013 to 2021 served as Minority Leader. He is a Delegate representing Maryland District 31 including all of Pasadena, Brooklyn Park, and parts of Glen Burnie, Severna Park and Millersville.

Personal life
Kipke is a businessman, investor, and works as a Territory Manager for Reps and Associates, Inc., a manufacturers' representative firm headquartered in Alexandria, Virginia. He is married to Susannah Warner Kipke, an employee of the National Rifle Association. They have three children. Kipke's first marriage, to Morgan Uebersax Kipke, ended in divorce in 2012. The Vote Smart web site in 2013 listed Nic and Morgan Kipke as having two children. Kipke's web site showed Nic and Morgan Kipke in photos with two children in 2008 and 2010.

In June 2020, Kipke came down with what he described as mild symptoms of COVID-19.

In the Legislature
Kipke serves on the Health and Government Operations Committee and on two health related subcommittees, Insurance and Minority Disparities.  In 2009 he was appointed Ranking Member of this committee by then Minority Leader, Del. Tony O'Donnell.  His appointment came after veteran legislator and retired pharmacist, Delegate Elliott stepped aside.  Elliott personally urged the minority leader to select Kipke as his replacement.  Kipke was elected Minority Leader in 2013, unseating Tony O'Donnell.

Legislative notes
 Passed legislation in 2010 to allow dental hygienists to work independently, within their scope of practice, in long-term care facilities and nursing homes.
 Authored legislation that created the Maryland Commission on Autism in 2009.
 Passed legislation in 2009 that required a preference for environment-friendly cleaning products in public schools.
 Co-sponsored legislation in 2009 to require that American flags purchased by the State of Maryland be made in the United States.
 Passed legislation in 2009 that repealed the Maryland Soda Fountain/Dispenser Tax, which had been on the books since 1926.
 Sponsored and passed the Fallen Soldier Privacy Protection Act of 2008.
 Sponsored and passed a major pharmaceutical reform measure in 2008 to improve transparency and reduce the cost of prescription drugs.
 Co-sponsored legislation in 2008 that prohibits the sale of children's items that contain lead paint.
 Co-sponsored legislation in 2008 to require all state expenditures be posted online for public scrutiny.
 Voted against in-state tuition for illegal immigrants in 2007 (HB6)
 Voted for the ban on panhandling in Anne Arundel County that took effect on October 1, 2007
 Voted for Martin O'Malley's budget in 2007 but against it in 2008, 2009 and 2010.

Election results
2006 Race for Maryland House of Delegates – 31st District
Voters to choose three:
{| class="wikitable"
|-
!Name
!Votes
!Percent
!Outcome
|-
|- 
|Steve Schuh, Rep.
|19,049
|  18.4%
|   Won
|-
|-
|Nicholaus R. Kipke, Rep.
|18,150
|  17.5%
|   Won
|-
|-
|Donald H. Dwyer Jr., Rep.
|17,558
|  17.0%
|   Won
|-
|-
|Thomas J. Fleckenstein, Dem.
|16,654
|  16.1%
|   Lost
|-
|-
|Craig A. Reynolds, Dem.
|14,454
|  14.0%
|   Lost
|-
|-
|Joan Cadden, Dem.
|17,533
|  16.9%
|   Lost
|-
|Other Write-Ins
|       75
|    0.1%
|
|-
|}
 The largest donor to Kipke's 2006 campaign was his then-wife,  Morgan Uebersax Kipke, with Kipke himself being the second largest donor.

2010 Race for Maryland House of Delegates – 31st District
Voters to choose three:
{| class="wikitable"
|-
! Name !! Votes !! Percent !! Outcome
|- 
| Nicholaus R. Kipke, Republican || 24,143 ||   22.0% ||    Won
|- 
| Steve Schuh, Republican || 22,805 ||   20.7% ||    Won
|- 
| Don Dwyer Jr., Republican || 22,452 ||   20.4% ||    Won
|- 
| Jeremiah Chiappelli, Democratic || 12,943 ||   11.8% ||    Lost
|- 
| Justin M. Towles, Democratic || 11,968 ||   10.9% ||    Lost
|- 
| Robert L. Eckert, Democratic || 11,856 ||   10.8% ||    Lost
|- 
| Joshua Matthew Crandall, Libertarian ||  2,015 ||    1.8% ||    Lost
|- 
| Cory Faust Sr., Constitution ||  1,660 ||    1.5% ||    Lost
|-
| Other Write-Ins ||     105 ||    0.1% || 
|}

2014 Race for Maryland House of Delegates – 31B District
Voters to choose two:
{| class="wikitable"
|-
! Name !! Votes !! Percent !! Outcome
|- 
| Nicholaus R. Kipke, Republican || 20,858 ||   39.9% ||   Won
|- 
| Meagan C. Simonaire, Republican || 19,555 ||   37.4% ||   Won
|- 
| Jeremiah Chiappelli, Democratic ||   6,332 ||   12.1% ||    Lost
|- 
| Doug Morris, Democratic ||   5,394 ||   10.3% ||    Lost
|-
| Other Write-Ins ||        88 ||     0.2% || 
|}

2018 Race for Maryland House of Delegates – 31B District
Voters to choose two:
{| class="wikitable"
|-
! Name !! Votes !! Percent !! Outcome
|- 
| Brian Chisholm, Republican || 20,573 ||   33.2% ||   Won
|- 
| Nicholaus R. Kipke, Republican || 20,434 ||   33.0% ||   Won
|- 
| Karen Patricia Simpson, Democratic || 11,257 ||   18.2% ||    Lost
|- 
| Harry E. Freeman, Democratic ||   9,602 ||   15.5% ||    Lost
|-
| Other Write-Ins ||        49 ||     0.1% || 
|}

References

External links

 (Official Website)

1979 births
21st-century American politicians
Living people
Republican Party members of the Maryland House of Delegates
Politicians from Baltimore